Tall al-Ajjul or Tell el-'Ajul is an archaeological mound or tell in the Gaza Strip. The fortified city excavated at the site dates as far back as ca. 2000-1800 BCE and was inhabited during the Bronze Age. It is located at the mouth of Wadi Ghazzah just south of the town of Gaza.

History
Archaeologists have excavated remains dated mainly to the Middle and Late Bronze Age.

Middle Bronze

Middle Bronze IIA
In the MBIIA, Tell el-Ajjul was an important city in the Southern Levant.

Middle Bronze IIB-C
In the MB IIB, the population increased and many sites developed in the southern Levant. Tell el-Ajjul had the largest number of Egyptian Second Intermediate Period imports.

Late Bronze
Large quantities of pumice were deposited during the Late Bronze Age, which may  have been caused by the Thera (Santorini) volcanic eruption. If proven correct, this would offer a good correlation and dating tool.

Treaty of Tell Ajul (1229)
The Sixth Crusade came to an end with the so-called Treaty of Jaffa and Tell Ajul. These were in fact two different treaties, the first being the one signed at Tell Ajul by the competing Ayyubid rulers of Egypt, Syria and various smaller principalities. This treaty settled their territorial disputes and left Sultan Al-Kamil of Egypt in a very powerful position. The follow-up treaty was signed at Jaffa by Al-Kamil and the leader of the Sixth Crusade, Emperor Frederick II, thus removing the threat posed to Al-Kamil by the European armies.

Identification
Ajjul has been and remains one of the proposed sites for Sharuhen and for Beth Eglaim mentioned in Eusebius's Onomasticon, in contrast with Petrie's initial identification with ancient Gaza. Eusebius placed Beth Eglaim at eight Roman miles from Gaza. The name is absent from the Bible, and is given by Eusebius in Greek as Bethaglaim.

In the 1970s, the archaeologist Aharon Kempinski proposed identifying Tall al-Ajjul with Sharuhen, the last stronghold of the Hyksos c. 1550 BCE.

Excavations
In 1930-1934 Tell el-Ajjul was excavated by British archaeologists under the direction of Sir Flinders Petrie, who thought the site was ancient Gaza. He was accompanied by Olga Tufnell. One of Flinders Petrie's discoveries were three hoards of Bronze Age gold jewellery, considered to be among the greatest Bronze Age finds in the Levant. Most of the collection is preserved at the British Museum in London and the Rockefeller Museum in Jerusalem.

In 1999 and 2000 the excavations were renewed by Peter M. Fischer and M. Sadeq because of a common interest in the protection and exploration of the site, but work was interrupted due to the outbreak of the Second Intifada.

A large amount of imported pottery from Cyprus has been discovered. These imports begin with Base-ring I, and White Slip I types of pottery. In particular, over 200 sherds of White Slip I have been found, which pottery is rarely found outside of Cyprus. The majority of the sherds, nevertheless, are of the later White Slip II and Base-ring II wares. There are also sherds of other kinds of Cypriot pottery, including Bichrome Wheel-made, Monochrome, Red Lustrous Wheel-made, and White Painted V/VI. Mycenean pottery and such from Upper Egypt were also found.

See also
Tell es-Sakan
Ein HaBesor

Notes

Bibliography

Early Descriptions
    (visit in 1863: p. 212 )

Excavation Reports

Subsequent Archaeological Studies

 (reprinted in )

Encyclopedia Articles

*

Museum Collections
 (Search for "place=Ajjul").

External links

Palestinian-Swedish Project at Tell el-Ajjul

History of Palestine (region)
Archaeology of the Near East
Archaeological sites in the Gaza Strip
Tells (archaeology)